Montanari may refer to:

 Montanari (surname), an Italian surname
 Montanari (crater), a lunar crater
 8421 Montanari, a main-belt asteroid
 Antonio Montanari, baroque composer

See also 

 Montanaro (disambiguation)